The large Aden gerbil (Gerbillus poecilops) is a species of rodent in the family Muridae.
It is found in Saudi Arabia and Yemen.

References

Gerbillus
Mammals described in 1895
Taxa named by Oldfield Thomas
Taxonomy articles created by Polbot